In chemistry, polyvalency (or polyvalence, multivalency) is the property of chemical species  (generally atoms or molecules) that exhibit more than one valence by forming multiple chemical bonds (Fig. 1). A bivalent species can form two bonds; a trivalent species can form three bonds; and so on.

The principle of polyvalency also applies to larger species, such as antibodies, medical drugs, and even nanoparticles surface-functionalized with ligands, like spherical nucleic acids, which can show enhanced or cooperative binding compared to their monovalent counterparts. Nanoparticles with multiple nucleic acid strands on their surfaces (e.g., DNA) can form multiple bonds with one another by DNA hybridization to form hierarchical assemblies, some of which are highly crystalline in nature.

References 

Chemical properties

Chemical bonding
Dimensionless numbers of chemistry